Saskia Slegers (born  1962) is a Dutch DJ and producer who has run the influential music label Djax since 1989. She deejays dance music as Miss Djax.

Career 
Based in Eindhoven, Slegers started to DJ, make and release dance music in the 1980s. She set up the label Djax  in 1989, investing 10,000 guilders. Her first release of 1,000 records sold out in a week, so she pressed up more copies and immediately recouped her start up costs. Looking back in 2009, she said "It was a question of the right time, the right decision and the right product".<ref name="Digitale">{{cite news |last1=Van den Muijsenberg |first1=Frank |title=Miss Djax wil geen digitale fabriek zijn |url=https://www.parool.nl/kunst-media/miss-djax-wil-geen-digitale-fabriek-zijn~b440978b/ |work=Het Parool |date=28 August 2009 |language=nl-NL |quote="Een kwestie van het juiste moment, de juiste beslissing en het juiste product.}}</ref> Another early success was signing the Amsterdam hiphop group Osdorp Posse in 1991. In the early 1990s, Slegers started to put on techno parties at the Effenaar in Eindhoven. As well as techno and hip hop, Slegers made and released breakcore. She was voted Best DJ by the German magazine Frontpage in 1992.

 Label 
Slegers' record label Djax and its subsidiaries played a large role in introducing Chicago-style techno to the Netherlands and promoting it around the world. It has released artists such as Armando, Robert Armani and Mike Dearborn. After ten years, she produced a book entitled 1989 – 1999 Djax Records''. To celebrate thirty years of the label, Slegers organised a twelve-hour party at Elementenstraat in Amsterdam in late 2019. The label has over 400 releases.

References

External links 
 Dekmantel documentary about Djax
 

Dutch DJs
Living people
Dutch businesspeople
Dutch record producers
Electronic dance music DJs
20th-century Dutch musicians
21st-century Dutch musicians
Year of birth missing (living people)